Joseph F. "Bells" Colone (January 23, 1924 – July 1, 2009) was an American professional basketball player for the New York Knicks.

Early life
Colone attended Berwick High School in Berwick, Pennsylvania and then played basketball collegiately at Bloomsburg State Teachers College (now named Bloomsburg University of Pennsylvania).

Professional career
He was not drafted into the NBA but still managed to make the Knicks' roster for the 1948–49 season. At 6 feet 5 inches tall and 210 pounds, Joe played the forward position. He only played for one season in the NBA and appeared in 15 games while averaging 5.5 points.

Personal
After his brief stint in the NBA, Colone migrated to Woodbury, New Jersey to teach. He taught at Woodbury Junior-Senior High School from 1954 to 1986. He was an assistant coach for the football and basketball teams there. Colone mentored rising basketball star Dave Budd, who later went on to play at Wake Forest University and then, coincidentally, the New York Knicks. Budd is still the only Woodbury High School graduate to ever reach the NBA. Budd's career lasted five seasons and he was also responsible in sharing the duty of guarding Wilt Chamberlain during his 100-point game. Budd and Colone stayed friends throughout the rest of Colone's life.

Joe "Bells" Colone died at age 83 on July 1, 2009 after many years of fighting various illnesses. He had been married to his wife Genevieve for 57 years and had five children – four sons and one daughter.

BAA career statistics

Regular season

Playoffs

References

1924 births
2009 deaths
American Basketball League (1925–1955) players
Basketball players from New Jersey
Basketball players from Pennsylvania
Bloomsburg Huskies men's basketball players
High school basketball coaches in New Jersey
High school football coaches in New Jersey
Forwards (basketball)
New York Knicks players
People from Berwick, Pennsylvania
Sportspeople from Woodbury, New Jersey
Undrafted National Basketball Association players
Wilkes-Barre Barons players
20th-century American educators
American men's basketball players